The Irish Church Act 1869 (32 & 33 Vict. c. 42) was an Act of the Parliament of the United Kingdom which separated the Church of Ireland from the Church of England and disestablished the former, a body that commanded the adherence of a small minority of the population of Ireland. The Act was passed during the first ministry of William Ewart Gladstone and came into force on 1 January 1871. It was strongly opposed by Conservatives in both houses of Parliament.

The Act meant the Church of Ireland was no longer entitled to collect tithes from the people of Ireland. It also ceased to send representative bishops as Lords Spiritual  to the House of Lords in Westminster. Existing clergy of the church received a life annuity in lieu of the revenues to which they were no longer entitled: tithes, rentcharge, ministers' money, stipends and augmentations, and certain marriage and burial fees.

The passage of the Bill through Parliament caused acrimony between the House of Commons and the House of Lords. Queen Victoria personally intervened to mediate. While the Lords extorted from the Commons more compensation to alleviate the disestablished churchmen, in the end, the will of the Commons prevailed.

The Irish Church Act was a key move in dismantling the Protestant Ascendancy which had dominated Ireland for several centuries previously.

See also 
 Antidisestablishmentarianism
 Religion in the United Kingdom
 Welsh Church Act 1914

Sources
Primary 
 
 
 Hansard 1869: 
 Commons vol 194–6: 2nd reading 18 Mar 19 Mar 22 Mar 23 Mar; Committee 15 Apr 16 Apr 19 Apr 22 Apr 23 Apr 26 Apr 29 Apr 3 May 4 May 6 May 7 May; Consideration 13 May; 3rd reading 31 May
 Lords vol 196–7: 2nd reading 14 Jun 15 Jun 17 Jun  18 Jun; Committee 29 Jun 1 Jul 2 Jul 5 Jul 6 Jul; Report 9 Jul; 3rd reading Jul 12
Vol 198 Commons rejects Lords amendments Jul 16 Lords insists 22 Jul Commons accedes 23 Jul

References

Further reading
 Fair, John D. "The Irish disestablishment conference of 1869." Journal of Ecclesiastical History 26.4 (1975): 379-394.
 MacCarthy, Robert Ancient and Modern: a short history of the Church of Ireland. Four Courts Press Ltd., 1995
 McCormack, Christopher F. "The Irish Church Disestablishment Act (1869) and the general synod of the Church of Ireland (1871): the art and structure of educational reform." History of Education 47.3 (2018): 303-320.
 McDowell, Robert Brendan. The Church of Ireland 1869-1969 (Routledge, 2017_.
Todd, Charles Hawkes. The Irish Church Act (1869): With Observations. Hodges, Foster & Co. Dublin. 1869. Google Books.
 Lee, Alfred Theophilus. The Irish Church Act. A Popular Account of "The Irish Church Act, 1869," 32 & 33 Victoria, c. 42. P S King. London. Hodges, Foster & Co. Dublin. 1869. Google Books
 Bernard William Leigh. The Irish Church Acts, 1869 & 1872: And Various Statutes Connected Therewith. Hodges, Foster & Co. Dublin. 1869. Google Books.
 Bernard, William Leigh. Decisions under the Irish Church Act, 1869, 32 & 33 Victoria, Cap. 42, and Details of the Annuities Ordered and Declared by the Commissioners of Church Temporalities in Ireland, with an Index. Alexander Thom. Hodges, Foster & Co. Dublin. Simpkin, Marshall & Co. London. 1869. Google Books.
 Jellett, Morgan Woodward. The Irish Church Act. The Compensation and Commutation Clauses Considered; with which are Combined Opinions of Sir Roundell Palmer M.P., D.C.L., and References to the Rules and Orders of the Commissioners. Second Edition. Hodges, Foster & Co. Dublin. 1869. Google Books.
 "Irish Church Act, 1869". eISB.
"Irish Church Act 1869". The Statutes Revised, Northern Ireland. HMSO. 1982. Volume 2. Page 649. Google Books.
Chronological Table of and Index to the Statutes. Eleventh Edition. 1890. p 347.

External links 
 Church of Ireland: Disestablishment 150 online resources and 2019–2020 programme of events marking the 150th anniversary of disestablishment
 A Brief History of Disestablishment, United Dioceses of Dublin and Glendalough

Anglicanism
History of Christianity in the United Kingdom
Church of Ireland
Religion and politics
British constitutional laws concerning Ireland
United Kingdom Acts of Parliament 1869
1869 in Ireland
Christianity and law in the 19th century
Acts of the Parliament of the United Kingdom concerning Ireland
1869 disestablishments in the United Kingdom
1869 in Christianity
Law about religion in the United Kingdom
July 1869 events
Constitutional laws of Northern Ireland